Julien Alfred (born 10 June 2001) is a Saint Lucian sprinter. She won the silver medal in the 100 metres at the 2022 Commonwealth Games. Alfred is the joint North American indoor record holder for the 60 metres.

She was the first woman in NCAA to break the seven-second barrier over the 60 m. Alfred is a four-time NCAA champion.

Biography
Born in the south Castries community of Ciceron, Julien Alfred attended Leon Hess Comprehensive Secondary School in Saint Lucia (2013–15), and St. Catherine's High School in Jamaica (2015-2018). She then pursued a bachelor's degree in Youth & Community Studies at the University of Texas.

Alfred was a Central American and Caribbean U15 champion in 2015. Both that year and in 2017, she was recognised as Saint Lucia’s Junior Sportswoman of the Year. As a junior athlete, she was the Commonwealth Youth Games 100 m champion in 2017, when the Games were held in Nassau, Bahamas. She also captured silver in the 2018 Youth Olympic Games in Buenos Aires, Argentina behind Nigeria’s Rosemary Chukwuma.

2022
In 2022, Alfred had the all-time best NCAA performance in the 60 m at the NCAA Division I Indoor Championships, running a fast 7.04 s in the heats. Then at the age of 21, she became one of the top 30 fastest women ever. Her run of 10.81 s (+1.7 m/s) in preliminaries of the women’s 100 m at the Big 12 Conference Championships in Lubbock, Texas on 14 May was a Saint Lucia national and championship record. It also marked her as the fastest woman ever from the Organisation of Eastern Caribbean States. At the time, only six Caribbean women had ever run faster, and in the NACAC region 17. The same month, she ran a wind-aided 10.80 s (+2.2 m/s) at the NCAA West Preliminary Round - the fastest time ever recorded under any conditions at the event. She won the 2022 NCAA Division I 100 m/m title in 11.02 s (+0.2 m/s) the day after her 21st birthday, completing an unbeaten collegiate season in that event. Running for the University of Texas, she became the first track athlete from Saint Lucia to win a Division I championship, and just the second Saint Lucian overall, after high jumper Jeanelle Scheper. She next went on to win her event  at the inaugural Caribbean Games in Les Abymes, Guadeloupe in a time of 11.07 seconds (-0.2 m/s).

2023–present
On 25 February 2023, Alfred broke for the fourth time existing collegiate record and became the first woman in NCAA to ever dip under 7 seconds over the 60 metres with a time of 6.97 s at the Big 12 Indoor Championships in Lubbock, TX. Her time moved her up to eighth on the world all-time list. She also achieved the second-fastest all-time collegian mark in the 200 m of 22.26 s, behind only Abby Steiner, to become the fourth-fastest woman of all time. On March 11 at the NCCA Indoors in Albuquerque, New Mexico (at altitude), Alfred improved at both these events with times of 6.94 s and 22.01 s respectively to take both titles and move to second on both respective world all-time lists. With "the greatest ever one day sprint double", she missed Irina Privalova's 60 m world record from 1993 by two hundredths of a second but equalled Aleia Hobbs' North American record. In the 200 m, only Merlene Ottey’s 21.87 s dating back also to 1993 had been faster.

Achievements

International competitions

NCAA titles
 NCAA Division I Women's Outdoor Track and Field Championships
 100 metres: 2022
 4 × 100 m relay: 2022
 NCAA Division I Women's Indoor Track and Field Championships
 60 metres: 2023
 200 metres: 2023

References

External links
 
Julien Alfred, University of Texas Longhorns

2001 births
Living people
Saint Lucian female athletes
World Athletics Championships athletes for Saint Lucia
Athletes (track and field) at the 2018 Summer Youth Olympics
Athletes (track and field) at the 2022 Commonwealth Games
Texas Longhorns women's track and field athletes
Commonwealth Games medallists in athletics
Commonwealth Games medallists for Saint Lucia
Medallists at the 2022 Commonwealth Games